The 2023 Rally Sweden (also known as the Swedish Rally 2023) was a motor racing event for rally cars that held over four days between 9 and 12 February 2023. It marked the seventieth running of the Rally Sweden, and was the second round of the 2023 World Rally Championship, World Rally Championship-2 and World Rally Championship-3. The event was also the first round of the 2023 Junior World Rally Championship.

Kalle Rovanperä and Jonne Halttunen were the defending rally winners. Their team, Toyota Gazoo Racing WRT, were the defending manufacturers' winners. Andreas Mikkelsen and Torstein Eriksen were the defending rally winners in the WRC-2 category. Lauri Joona and Mikael Korhonen were the defending rally winners in the WRC-3 category. Jon Armstrong and Brian Hoy were defending rally winners of the junior championship.

Ott Tänak and Martin Järveoja won the rally. Their team, M-Sport Ford WRT were the manufacturer's winners. Oliver Solberg and Elliott Edmondson won the World Rally Championship-2 category. Roope Korhonen and Anssi Viinikka won the World Rally Championship-3 category. The Motorsport Ireland Rally Academy crew of William Creighton and Liam Regan won the junior championship by only 0.6 second.

Background

Entry list
The following crews are set to enter into the rally. The event would open to crews competing in the World Rally Championship, its support categories, the World Rally Championship-2, World Rally Championship-3, Junior World Rally Championship and privateer entries that are not registered to score points in any championship. Nine are due to enter under Rally1 regulations, as would be twenty-five Rally2 crews in the World Rally Championship-2 and ten Rally3 crews in the World Rally Championship-3. A total of nine crews are registered to participate in the Junior World Rally Championship.

Itinerary
All dates and times are CET (UTC+1).

Report

WRC Rally1

Classification

Special stages

Championship standings

WRC-2 Rally2

Classification

Special stages

Championship standings

WRC-3 Rally3

Classification

Special stages

Championship standings

J-WRC Rally3

Classification

Special stages

Championship standings

Notes

References

External links
  
 2023 Rally Sweden at eWRC-results.com
 2023 Rally Sweden at rally-maps.com 

2023 in Swedish motorsport
Sweden
February 2023 sports events in Sweden
2023